Bani Malik is a sub-district located in Mudhaykhirah District, Ibb Governorate, Yemen. Bani Malik had a population of 5,135 according to the 2004 census.

References 

Sub-districts in Mudhaykhirah District